Maria Tchernycheva born in St. Petersburg, Russia is working in the field of photonics and nanotechnology at both the Universite Paris-Sud XI and Centre national de la recherche scientifique. She has an h-index of 31 with the most cited work being Systematic experimental and theoretical investigation of intersubband absorption in Ga N/ Al N quantum wells which was published in 2006 and received 211 since that year.

References

Living people
Russian nanotechnologists
Optical physicists
Year of birth missing (living people)